Fomichevo is a rural locality (a village) in Kosinskoye Rural Settlement, Kosinsky District, Perm Krai, Russia. The population was 14 as of 2010. There is 1 street.

Geography 
Fomichevo is located 36 km north of Kosa (the district's administrative centre) by road. Nyatyaino is the nearest rural locality.

References 

Rural localities in Kosinsky District